Zygmunt Przyjemski of Rawicz (died 3 June 1652) was a Polish military commander and a member of the administration of the Polish–Lithuanian Commonwealth. A general of artillery and, at the same time, the Field Writer of the Crown, he was taken captive by the Cossacks in the Battle of Batoh, in which he commanded the Polish infantry. He was executed soon afterwards with a few thousands other Polish prisoners taken in that battle.

Bibliography
 Kazimierz Lepszy (red.): Słownik biograficzny historii powszechnej do XVII stulecia. Warszawa: Wiedza Powszechna, 1968.

References 

Generals of the Polish–Lithuanian Commonwealth
Polish generals
1652 deaths
Year of birth unknown
Polish nobility